Arthur Miley (born March 3, 1993) is an American football outside linebacker who is currently a free agent. He played college football at Southern University for the SU Jaguars. In 2014, Miley was named First-team All-SWAC. He has also spent time with the Miami Dolphins, Carolina Panthers, Indianapolis Colts, Saskatchewan Roughriders, and San Antonio Commanders.

Professional career

Carolina Panthers
Miley signed with the Carolina Panthers as an undrafted free agent on May 8, 2015. He was placed on injured reserve on September 5, 2015.

On February 7, 2016, Miley's Panthers played in Super Bowl 50. In the game, the Panthers fell to the Denver Broncos by a score of 24–10.

Miley was released by the Panthers on September 3, 2016.

Miami Dolphins
On January 10, 2017, Miley signed a reserve/future contract with the Miami Dolphins. He was waived on August 7, 2017.

Carolina Panthers (second stint)
Miley was claimed off waivers by the Panthers on August 8, 2017. He was waived on September 1, 2017.

Indianapolis Colts
On December 19, 2017, Miley was signed to the Indianapolis Colts' practice squad. He signed a reserve/future contract with the Colts on January 1, 2018. He was waived by the Colts on May 1, 2018.

San Antonio Commanders
In September 2018, Miley signed with the San Antonio Commanders of the Alliance of American Football. The league ceased operations in April 2019.

References

1993 births
Living people
Players of American football from Louisiana
People from Mangham, Louisiana
American football defensive ends
African-American players of American football
Southern Jaguars football players
Carolina Panthers players
Miami Dolphins players
Indianapolis Colts players
San Antonio Commanders players
21st-century African-American sportspeople